Metopoceras omar is a moth of the family Noctuidae first described by Charles Oberthür in 1887. It is widespread through the Palearctic eremic (desert) zone from north-western Africa to the Near East and Middle East.

Adults are on wing from January to April. There is one generation per year.

Subspecies
Metopoceras omar omar
Metopoceras omar felix (Cyprus, Egypt, Sinai, Israel, Jordan, Syria, Iraq, Kuwait, Lebanon, Saudi-Arabia, United Arab Emirates, Oman, eastern Africa)
Metopoceras omar maritima (Sicily)
Metopoceras omar caspica (Turkmenistran)

External links
species info

Metopoceras
Moths of Asia
Moths of Europe
Moths of the Middle East